Microcybe is a genus of plants in the family Rutaceae, all of which are native to Australia.

There are three species:
 
Microcybe albiflora Turcz. (Western Australia)
Microcybe multiflora Turcz. — red microcybe (Western Australia, South Australia, Victoria)
Microcybe pauciflora Turcz. — yellow microcybe (Western Australia, South Australia, Victoria)

References

External links

 
Zanthoxyloideae genera
Taxa named by Nikolai Turczaninow